Leonard C. Dunavant (October 29, 1919 – February 28, 1995) was an American businessman and politician from Tennessee who served as a Republican member of the Tennessee House of Representatives and Tennessee State Senate and an unsuccessful candidate in 1969 for a special election for U. S. Representative from Tennessee's 8th congressional district.

A native of Ripley, Tennessee, for many years he operated a furniture store in nearby Millington. He also served on the Millington City Council.

References 

1919 births
1995 deaths
Businesspeople from Tennessee
People from Ripley, Tennessee
Tennessee city council members
Republican Party members of the Tennessee House of Representatives
Republican Party Tennessee state senators
20th-century American businesspeople
20th-century American politicians
People from Millington, Tennessee